Rocca Pia is a comune and town in the Province of L'Aquila in the Abruzzo region of Italy. Its territory extended up to the level of the Cinquemiglia Plain.

References

External links
Official website

Cities and towns in Abruzzo